Freziera campanulata is a species of plant in the Pentaphylacaceae family. It is found in Ecuador and Peru.

References

campanulata
Vulnerable plants
Taxonomy articles created by Polbot